Freedom is an unincorporated community in both northeastern Caribou County, Idaho, and northwestern Lincoln County, Wyoming, in the United States; the Wyoming portion of the community is also a census-designated place (CDP). The population was 214 at the 2010 census.

Geography
Located on U.S. Route 89 and Idaho State Highway 34, Freedom sits on the Idaho/Wyoming state line. Although Freedom is unincorporated, its Wyoming side has a post office, with the ZIP code of 83120.

History
Freedom was established in 1879, and today it remains the oldest settlement in the Star Valley.  Similar to Colorado City, Arizona and Hildale, Utah, the community was settled as a border town by Mormon polygamists in order to escape arrest for polygamy: they could be free from Idaho police simply by walking into Wyoming.  The community was named for the freedom it gave these early settlers.

At one time, Freedom was the largest settlement in Star Valley.  There was a general store, a gas station, billiard hall, and other establishments.  Today some of the old buildings still stand, but very few are still in use.  The Post Office and Baseball Park are still used, along with the LDS Church, which was built in 1889. The headquarters of Freedom Arms, a gun factory and maker of a .454 Casull handgun, is located in the Wyoming portion of the community.

Demographics
The population of the ZCTA for ZIP Code 83120 was 471 at the 2000 census, with a racial makeup of 98.5% White, and 1.5% some other race.

Notable people
Randall Luthi, the former Speaker of the Wyoming House of Representatives resides in Freedom.

Rulon Gardner, born and raised in Star Valley. Rulon is a gold medal-winning Greco-Roman wrestler (2000—Sydney Olympics) and bronze medal winner in the (2004—Athens Olympic games.) He is the great-great-grandson of Archibald Gardner; (September 2, 1814 – February 8, 1902.) Archibald was a 19th-century pioneer and businessman who helped establish communities in Alvinston, Ontario, Canada; West Jordan, Utah; and Star Valley, Wyoming, based on flour mills and lumber mills. After 1858, he was a leader of The Church of Jesus Christ of Latter-day Saints in a position that was held for 32 years.

As a businessman, millwright and practical engineer, Archibald Gardner built 36 gristmills and lumber mills: 23 in Utah, six in Canada, five in Wyoming and two in Idaho. He also built hundreds of miles of canals, and many bridges in Utah.

Archibald Gardner's life is memorialized by a plaque in Alvinston, Archibald's Restaurant, a restored gristmill in West Jordan at Gardner Village, a plaque on 400 S 200 E, Spanish Fork, Utah for the first grist mill in town in 1858, and a monument in Afton ... The site where Archibald built his original flour mill in West Jordan, Utah is now known as Gardner Village and features a collection of other early pioneer homes that now house shops and a restaurant dedicated to him called Archibald's Restaurant.

References

Unincorporated communities in Caribou County, Idaho
Census-designated places in Lincoln County, Wyoming